The 1998 Soul Train Music Awards were held on February 27, 1998, at the Shrine Auditorium in Los Angeles, California. Puff Daddy was the top nominee with five nominations, other top nominees included Janet Jackson, Aaliyah and Maxwell. The show was hosted by Patti LaBelle, Erykah Badu and Heavy D.

Special awards

Sammy Davis Jr. Award for Entertainer of the Year
 Puff Daddy

Quincy Jones Award for Career Achievement
 Whitney Houston

Winners and nominees
Winners are in bold text.

R&B/Soul or Rap Album of the Year
 Erykah Badu – Baduizm
 Mary J. Blige – Share My World
 The Notorious B.I.G. – Life After Death
 Puff Daddy & the Family – No Way Out

Best R&B/Soul Album – Male
 Notorious B.I.G – Life After Death
 Joe – All That I Am
 Maxwell – MTV Unplugged
 Prince – Emancipation

Best R&B/Soul Album – Female
 Erykah Badu – Baduizm
 Mary J. Blige – Share My World
 Janet Jackson – The Velvet Rope
 Lil' Kim – Hard Core

Best R&B/Soul Album – Group, Band or Duo
 Dru Hill – Dru Hill
 Boyz II Men – Evolution
 Kirk Franklin and God's Property – God's Property from Kirk Franklin's Nu Nation
 Puff Daddy & the Family – No Way Out

Best R&B/Soul Single – Male
 Usher – "You Make Me Wanna..."
 Joe – "Don't Wanna Be a Player"
 R.Kelly – "I Believe I Can Fly"
 Kenny Lattimore – "For You"

Best R&B/Soul Single – Female
 Erykah Badu – "On and On"
 Aaliyah – "Journey to the Past"
 Mary J. Blige – "I Can Love You"
 Janet Jackson – "Got 'til It's Gone"

Best R&B/Soul Single – Group, Band or Duo
 Dru Hill – "In My Bed"
 Destiny's Child – "No, No, No"
 LSG – "My Body"
 Puff Daddy and Faith Evans  – "I'll Be Missing You"

The Michael Jackson Award for Best R&B/Soul or Rap Music
Puff Daddy and Faith Evans (featuring 112) - I'll Be Missing You
 Busta Rhymes – "Put Your Hands Where My Eyes Can See"
 Missy Elliott – "The Rain (Supa Dupa Fly)"
 The Notorious B.I.G. featuring Puff Daddy & Mase – ''Mo Money Mo Problems"

Best R&B/Soul or Rap New Artist
 Erykah Badu
 Missy Elliott
 God's Property
 Puff Daddy

Best Gospel Album
 Kirk Franklin and God's Property – God's Property from Kirk Franklin's Nu Nation
 The Canton Spirituals – Living the Dream: Live from Washington, D.C.
 GMWA Gospel Announcers Guild – So You Would Know
 The Williams Brothers – Still Standing

Best Jazz Album
 Boney James – Sweet Thing
 Zachary Breaux – Uptown Groove
 Dave Grusin – Dave Grusin Presents West Side Story
 The Williams Brothers – Black Diamond

Performers
 Janet Jackson – "I Get Lonely"
 Boyz II Men – "Doin' Just Fine"
 Puff Daddy, The LOX and Lil' Kim – "It's All About the Benjamins"
 Heavy D – "I'll Do Anything"
 God's Property and Kirk Franklin – "Stomp"
 Whitney Houston Tribute:
 Ronald Isley – "Exhale (Shoop Shoop)"
 Terry Ellis – "How Will I Know"
 Kenny Lattimore – "I Believe in You and Me"
 Monica – "You Give Good Love"
 Erykah Badu – "Certainly"
 Usher – "You Make Me Wanna..." and "Nice & Slow"
 Patti LaBelle – "If Only You Knew"
 Dru Hill and Jermaine Dupri – "In My Bed"

References

Soul Train Music Awards
Soul
Soul
Soul
1998 in Los Angeles